Ciulnița is a commune located in Ialomița County, Muntenia, Romania. It is composed of four villages: Ciulnița, Ion Ghica, Ivănești, and Poiana.

The commune is located in the south-central part of the county, on the border with Călărași County. Ciulnița is crossed by county road DJ201, which connects it to the west to Albești, Axintele, and Coșereni (where it ends in national road DN2) and to the east to Slobozia, Mărculești, and Țăndărei (where it ends in DN2A).

References

Communes in Ialomița County
Localities in Muntenia